Antonio Gramsci: i giorni del carcere (internationally released as Antonio Gramsci: The Days of Prison) is a 1977 Italian drama film directed by Lino Del Fra. It was awarded with the Golden Leopard at the Locarno International Film Festival.

Plot
Antonio Gramsci, sentenced to twenty years in prison by the fascist courts, relives the stages of his political career and private life: in particular the foundation of the Italian Communist Party, the useless resistance to the right-wing offensive, marriage, arrest, the conflict with Palmiro Togliatti. In prison, the politician is first considered a hero, then shunned because of his unconventional views on Stalin and the authoritarian involution of the USSR. Discharged from prison for health reasons, he died in 1937 in a clinic in Rome.

Cast 
Riccardo Cucciolla as Antonio Gramsci
Lea Massari as  Tania
Mimsy Farmer as Giulia
Jacques Herlin as  Lo Santo
Franco Graziosi as Dmitry Manuilsky
Andrea Aureli as anarchist
Umberto Raho as chaplain
Luigi Pistilli as  Gennaro Gramsci
John Steiner as  Laurin
Biagio Pelligra as Bruno
Paolo Bonacelli as  Bocchini 
Antonio Piovanelli as Athos
Luciano Bartoli as Worker in Turin
 as Giovanni Laj
Rate Furlan as Director of the prison
 as Palmiro Togliatti 
 as Worker in Turin
Pier Paolo Capponi as  Enrico
 as  Ercole
Pier Luigi Giorgio as  Giuseppe
Gianni Pulone as Worker in Turin
Pino Ammendola as  
Pietro Biondi as  
 as  
 as  
Fabrizio Miglione as  
Raymond Pellegrin as  
Bruno Rosa as  
Gino Usai as

References

External links

1977 films
1970s biographical drama films
Golden Leopard winners
Italian biographical drama films
1970s prison drama films
Works about Antonio Gramsci
1970s Italian-language films
Cultural depictions of Italian men
1970s Italian films